Vedovato is an Italian surname. Notable people with the surname include:

Giuseppe Vedovato (1912–2012), Italian politician
Guido Vedovato (born 1961), Italian painter and sculptor

Italian-language surnames